The M96 Group (also known as the Leo I Group) is a group of galaxies in the constellation Leo.  This group contains between 8 and 24 galaxies, including three Messier objects. It also contains the Leo Ring. The group is one of many groups that lies within the Virgo Supercluster (the combined Local Group and Virgo cluster).

Members

The table below lists galaxies that have been consistently identified as group members in the Nearby Galaxies Catalog, the survey of Fouque et al., the Lyons Groups of Galaxies (LGG) Catalog, and the three group lists created from the Nearby Optical Galaxy sample of Giuricin et al.

Nearby groups

The Leo Triplet, which includes the spiral galaxies M65, M66, and NGC 3628,  is located physically near the M96 Group.  Some group identification algorithms actually identify the Leo Triplet at part of the M96 Group.  The two groups may actually be separate parts of a much larger group.

See also
Leo II Groups
Virgo II Groups
Virgo III Groups

References

External links
 Leo I Galaxy Group

 
Leo (constellation)